Opuntia azurea, the purple prickly pear or coyotillo, is a long-spined prickly pear that is native to a variety of habitats, including desert, mountain grasslands, and slopes in the Big Bend region of Texas and in the states of Coahuila, Chihuahua, Durango, and Zacatecas in Mexico. It flowers from March to May, with bright yellow flowers with red centres which produce red/purple fruits. Opuntia azurea forms sprawling clusters, two to three feet high.

Its subspecies may include: 
 O. azurea aureispina
 O. azurea discolor
 O. azurea azurea
 O. azurea diplopurpurea
 O. azurea parva.
 O. azurea arueispina

However, instead of subspecies, five varieties have been described and ssp. "arueispina" is not recognized. 
 O. aureispina
 O. azurea
 O. discolor
 O. diplopurpurea, and
 O. parva.

References

azurea
Flora of Texas
Flora of Mexico